The 2008–09 Colorado Avalanche season was the franchise's 37th season, 30th in the National Hockey League, and 14th as the Colorado Avalanche.

The team finished last place in its division and conference for the first time since 1991-92 (when they were still the Quebec Nordiques) and did not qualify for the Stanley Cup Playoffs.

Pre-season

Regular season

The Avalanche struggled offensively, finishing 30th overall in scoring with just 192 goals (excluding 7 shootout-winning goals). They were also shut out a league-high 12 times, tied with the Los Angeles Kings.

Divisional standings

Conference standings

Schedule and results
 Green background indicates win (2 points).
 Red background indicates regulation loss (0 points).
 White background indicates overtime/shootout loss (1 point).

|- align="center" bgcolor="#ffbbbb"
| 1 || October 9 || Boston Bruins || 5 - 4 || || Budaj || 18,007 || 0-1-0 || 0
|- align="center" bgcolor="#ffbbbb"
| 2 || October 12 || @ Edmonton Oilers || 3 - 2 || || Budaj || 16,839 || 0-2-0 || 0
|- align="center" bgcolor="#ffbbbb"
| 3 || October 14 || @ Calgary Flames || 5 - 4 || || Budaj || 19,289 || 0-3-0 || 0
|- align="center" bgcolor="#bbffbb"
| 4 || October 16 || Philadelphia Flyers || 5 - 2 || || Raycroft || 18,007 || 1-3-0 || 2
|- align="center" bgcolor="#bbffbb"
| 5 || October 18 || @ Dallas Stars || 5 - 4 || || Raycroft || 17,151 || 2-3-0 || 4
|- align="center" bgcolor="#bbffbb"
| 6 || October 20 || @ Los Angeles Kings || 4 - 3 || || Budaj || 13,891 || 3-3-0 || 6
|- align="center" bgcolor="bbffbb"
| 7 || October 23 || Edmonton Oilers || 4 - 1 || || Budaj || 14,898 || 4-3-0 || 8
|- align="center" bgcolor="bbffbb"
| 8 || October 25 || Buffalo Sabres || 2 - 1 || SO (3-2) || Budaj || 18,007 || 5-3-0 || 10
|- align="center" bgcolor="#ffbbbb"
| 9 || October 28 || @ Calgary Flames || 3 - 0 || || Budaj || 19,289 || 5-4-0 || 10
|- align="center" bgcolor="ffbbbb"
| 10 || October 30 || Columbus Blue Jackets || 4 - 2 || || Raycroft || 14,945 || 5-5-0 || 10
|-

|- align="center" bgcolor="ffbbbb"
| 11 || November 2 || San Jose Sharks || 5 - 3 || || Budaj || 15,452 || 5-6-0 || 10
|- align="center" bgcolor="ffbbbb"
| 12 || November 3 || @ Chicago Blackhawks || 6 - 2 || || Budaj || 21,142 || 5-7-0 || 10
|- align="center" bgcolor="ffbbbb"
| 13 || November 6 || Minnesota Wild || 3 - 1 || || Budaj || 14,562 || 5-8-0 || 10
|- align="center" bgcolor="bbffbb"
| 14 || November 8 || Nashville Predators || 1 - 0 || || Budaj || 18,007 || 6-8-0 || 12
|- align="center" bgcolor="bbffbb"
| 15 || November 12 || @ Vancouver Canucks || 2 - 1 || SO (2-1) || Budaj || 18,630 || 7-8-0 || 14
|- align="center" bgcolor="bbffbb"
| 16 || November 15 || @ Edmonton Oilers || 3 - 2 || SO (2-1) || Budaj || 16,839 || 8-8-0 || 16
|- align="center" bgcolor="ffbbbb"
| 17 || November 18 || @ Calgary Flames || 4 - 1 || || Budaj || 19,289 || 8-9-0 || 16
|- align="center" bgcolor="ffbbbb"
| 18 || November 20 || Calgary Flames || 1 - 0 || || Budaj || 14,536 || 8-10-0 || 16
|- align="center" bgcolor="bbffbb"
| 19 || November 22 || @ Los Angeles Kings || 4 - 3 || SO (2-0) || Budaj || 18,118 || 9-10-0 || 18
|- align="center" bgcolor="ffbbbb"
| 20 || November 24 || Anaheim Ducks || 4 - 1 || || Budaj || 16,632 || 9-11-0 || 18
|- align="center" bgcolor="bbffbb"
| 21 || November 26 || St. Louis Blues || 3 - 1 || || Budaj || 14,568 || 10-11-0 || 20
|- align="center" bgcolor="ffbbbb"
| 22 || November 28 || Phoenix Coyotes || 2 - 1 || || Budaj || 14,031 || 10-12-0 || 20
|- align="center" bgcolor="bbffbb"
| 23 || November 29 || Tampa Bay Lightning || 4 - 3 || || Raycroft || 18,007 || 11-12-0 || 22
|-

|- align="center" bgcolor="bbffbb"
| 24 || December 1 || @ Minnesota Wild || 6 - 5 || || Budaj || 18,568 || 12-12-0 || 24
|- align="center" bgcolor="ffbbbb"
| 25 || December 4 || @ Nashville Predators || 3 - 2 || || Budaj || 12,717 || 12-13-0 || 24
|- align="center" bgcolor="
| 26 || December 5 || @ Dallas Stars || 2 - 1 || SO (2-1) || Budaj || 16,651 || 12-13-1 || 25
|- align="center" bgcolor="bbffbb"
| 27 || December 7 || Vancouver Canucks || 5 - 4 || SO (3-1) || Budaj || 13,411 || 13-13-1 || 27
|- align="center" bgcolor="bbffbb"
| 28 || December 9 || Los Angeles Kings || 6 - 1 || || Budaj || 14,122 || 14-13-1 || 29
|- align="center" bgcolor="ffbbbb"
| 29 || December 12 || Chicago Blackhawks || 4 - 3 || || Budaj || 17,569 || 14-14-1 || 29
|- align="center" bgcolor="bbffbb"
| 30 || December 15 || @ Detroit Red Wings || 3 - 2 || || Raycroft || 19,154 || 15-14-1 || 31
|- align="center" bgcolor="ffbbbb"
| 31 || December 16 || @ Philadelphia Flyers || 5 - 2 || || Budaj || 19,219 || 15-15-1 || 31
|- align="center" bgcolor="bbffbb"
| 32 || December 18 || @ Tampa Bay Lightning || 2 - 1 || SO (1-0) || Raycroft || 16,333 || 16-15-1 || 33
|- align="center" bgcolor="ffbbbb"
| 33 || December 21 || @ Florida Panthers || 3 - 0 || || Budaj || 16,132 || 16-16-1 || 33
|- align="center" bgcolor="bbffbb"
| 34 || December 23 || Phoenix Coyotes || 5 - 4 || OT || Raycroft || 14,625 || 17-16-1 || 35
|- align="center" bgcolor="bbffbb"
| 35 || December 27 || Detroit Red Wings || 4 - 3 || SO (1-0) || Budaj || 18,007 || 18-16-1 || 37
|- align="center" bgcolor="bbffbb"
| 36 || December 29 || Nashville Predators || 5 - 1 || || Budaj || 15,643 || 19-16-1 || 39
|- align="center" bgcolor="ffbbbb"
| 37 || December 31 || @ Phoenix Coyotes || 3 - 1 || || Budaj || 15,008 || 19-17-1 || 39
|-

|- align="center" bgcolor="ffbbbb"
| 38 || January 2 || Columbus Blue Jackets || 6 - 1 || || Budaj || 14,482 || 19-18-1 || 39
|- align="center" bgcolor="ffbbbb"
| 39 || January 4 || Minnesota Wild || 2 - 0 || || Budaj || 14,125 || 19-19-1 || 39
|- align="center" bgcolor="bbffbb"
| 40 || January 6 || @ Nashville Predators || 2 - 1 || || Raycroft || 13,598 || 20-19-1 || 41
|- align="center" bgcolor="bbffbb"
| 41 || January 8 || Chicago Blackhawks || 2 - 1 || || Raycroft || 15,174 || 21-19-1 || 43
|- align="center" bgcolor="bbffbb"
| 42 || January 10 || Pittsburgh Penguins || 5 - 3 || || Raycroft || 17,908 || 22-19-1 || 45
|- align="center" bgcolor="ffbbbb"
| 43 || January 13 || @ Columbus Blue Jackets || 4 - 3 || || Raycroft || 15,343 || 22-20-1 || 45
|- align="center" bgcolor="ffbbbb"
| 44 || January 15 || @ St. Louis Blues || 5 - 2 || || Budaj || 17,545 || 22-21-1 || 45
|- align="center" bgcolor="ffbbbb"
| 45 || January 16 || Edmonton Oilers || 3 - 2 || || Raycroft || 15,681 || 22-22-1 || 45
|- align="center" bgcolor="bbffbb"
| 46 || January 18 || Calgary Flames || 6 - 2 || || Budaj || 16,113 || 23-22-1 || 47
|- align="center" bgcolor="ffbbbb"
| 47 || January 21 || Los Angeles Kings || 6 - 5 || || Raycroft || 13,289 || 23-23-1 || 47
|- align="center" bgcolor="ffbbbb"
| 48 || January 27 || San Jose Sharks || 3 - 0 || || Raycroft || 14,592 || 23-24-1 || 47
|- align="center" bgcolor="ffbbbb"
| 49 || January 29 || Toronto Maple Leafs || 7 - 4 || || Raycroft || 15,216 || 23-25-1 || 47
|- align="center" bgcolor="ffbbbb"
| 50 || January 31 || Anaheim Ducks || 4 - 3 || || Budaj || 17,652 || 23-26-1 || 47
|-

|- align="center" bgcolor="bbffbb"
| 51 || February 2 || Calgary Flames || 4 - 3 || || Budaj || 13,409 || 24-26-1 || 49
|- align="center" bgcolor="bbffbb"
| 52 || February 5 || Dallas Stars || 3 - 2 || || Budaj || 13,624 || 25-26-1 || 51
|- align="center" bgcolor="ffbbbb"
| 53 || February 7 || @ St. Louis Blues || 4 - 1 || || Budaj || 19,250 || 25-27-1 || 51
|- align="center" bgcolor="ffbbbb"
| 54 || February 10 || @ Columbus Blue Jackets || 3 - 0 || || Budaj || 14,506 || 25-28-1 || 51
|- align="center" bgcolor="ffbbbb"
| 55 || February 11 || @ Minnesota Wild || 3 - 2 || || Raycroft || 18,568 || 25-29-1 || 51
|- align="center" bgcolor="ffbbbb"
| 56 || February 13 || Montreal Canadiens || 4 - 2 || || Budaj || 17,514 || 25-30-1 || 51
|- align="center" bgcolor="bbffbb"
| 57 || February 15 || @ Detroit Red Wings || 6 - 5 || SO (2-1) || Raycroft || 20,066 || 26-30-1 || 53
|- align="center" bgcolor="bbffbb"
| 58 || February 17 || Ottawa Senators || 3 - 2 || OT || Raycroft || 15,237 || 27-30-1 || 55
|- align="center" bgcolor="bbffbb"
| 59 || February 20 || @ Washington Capitals || 4 - 1 || || Raycroft || 18,277 || 28-30-1 || 57
|- align="center" bgcolor="ffbbbb"
| 60 || February 22 || @ Carolina Hurricanes || 5 - 2 || || Raycroft || 18,680 || 28-31-1 || 57
|- align="center" bgcolor="ffbbbb"
| 61 || February 24 || @ Atlanta Thrashers || 4 - 3 || || Budaj || 12,101 || 28-32-1 || 57
|- align="center" bgcolor="ffbbbb"
| 62 || February 26 || @ New Jersey Devils || 4 - 0 || || Raycroft || 16,107 || 28-33-1 || 57
|- align="center" bgcolor="ffbbbb"
| 63 || February 28 || @ New York Rangers || 6 - 1 || || Budaj || 18,200 || 28-34-1 || 57
|-

|- align="center" bgcolor="ffbbbb"
| 64 || March 2 || @ New York Islanders || 4 - 2 || || Raycroft || 11,298 || 28-35-1 || 57
|- align="center" bgcolor="ffbbbb"
| 65 || March 4 || Detroit Red Wings || 3 - 2 || || Raycroft || 18,007 || 28-36-1 || 57
|- align="center" bgcolor="bbffbb"
| 66 || March 8 || @ Chicago Blackhawks || 5 - 1 || || Budaj || 22,121 || 29-36-1 || 59
|- align="center" bgcolor="ffbbbb"
| 67 || March 10 || Atlanta Thrashers || 3 - 0 || || Budaj || 13,608 || 29-37-1 || 59
|- align="center" bgcolor="bbffbb"
| 68 || March 12 || Minnesota Wild || 2 - 1 || SO (2-0) || Budaj || 14,213 || 30-37-1 || 61
|- align="center" bgcolor="bbffbb"
| 69 || March 14 || @ Edmonton Oilers || 3 - 2 || OT || Budaj || 16,839 || 31-37-1 || 63
|- align="center" bgcolor="ffbbbb"
| 70 || March 15 || @ Vancouver Canucks || 4 - 2 || || Raycroft || 18,630 || 31-38-1 || 63
|- align="center" bgcolor="
| 71 || March 17 || @ Minnesota Wild || 3 - 2 || SO (2-1) || Budaj || 18,568 || 31-38-2 || 64
|- align="center" bgcolor="ffbbbb"
| 72 || March 19 || Edmonton Oilers || 8 - 1 || || Budaj || 13,612 || 31-39-2 || 64
|- align="center" bgcolor="ffbbbb"
| 73 || March 22 || @ San Jose Sharks || 3 - 1 || || Raycroft || 17,496 || 31-40-2 || 64
|- align="center" bgcolor="ffbbbb"
| 74 || March 25 || Anaheim Ducks || 7 - 2 || || Budaj || 16,279 || 31-41-2 || 64
|- align="center" bgcolor="ffbbbb"
| 75 || March 27 || Vancouver Canucks || 4 - 1 || || Raycroft || 16,177 || 31-42-2 || 64
|- align="center" bgcolor="ffbbbb"
| 76 || March 29 || @ Anaheim Ducks || 4 - 1 || || Budaj || 17,182 || 31-43-2 || 64
|-

|- align="center" bgcolor="ffbbbb"
| 77 || April 1 || Phoenix Coyotes || 3 - 0 || || Raycroft || 13,437 || 31-44-2 || 64
|- align="center" bgcolor="bbffbb"
| 78 || April 5 || @ Vancouver Canucks || 4 - 1 || || Budaj || 18,630 || 32-44-2 || 66
|- align="center" bgcolor="
| 79 || April 7 || @ San Jose Sharks || 1 - 0 || SO (1-0) || Budaj || 17,496 || 32-44-3 || 67
|- align="center" bgcolor="
| 80 || April 9 || Dallas Stars || 3 - 2 || SO (3-2) || Budaj || 13,822 || 32-44-4 || 68
|- align="center" bgcolor="
| 81 || April 11 || Vancouver Canucks || 1 - 0 || OT || Budaj || 13,397 || 32-44-5 || 69
|- align="center" bgcolor="ffbbbb"
| 82 || April 12 || St. Louis Blues || 1 - 0 || || Raycroft || 13,661 || 32-45-5 || 69
|-

Playoffs
The Colorado Avalanche failed to qualify for the 2009 NHL Playoffs.

Player statistics

Skaters

Goaltenders

†Denotes player spent time with another team before joining Avalanche. Stats reflect time with the Avalanche only.
‡Traded mid-season

Awards and records

Records

Milestones

Transactions

Trades

Free agents

Claimed from waivers

Draft picks
Colorado's picks at the 2008 NHL Entry Draft in Ottawa • Ontario.

See also
2008–09 NHL season

Farm teams

Lake Erie Monsters
The Avalanche's American Hockey League affiliate was the Lake Erie Monsters, based in Cleveland, Ohio.

Johnstown Chiefs
The Johnstown Chiefs of the ECHL were the Avalanche's second-tier affiliate.

References

Colorado Avalanche seasons
C
C
Colorado Avalanche
Colorado Avalanche